Joseph Kinloch was an English footballer. His regular position was as a forward. He was born in Blackburn. He played for Manchester United.

External links
MUFCInfo.com profile

Year of birth missing
English footballers
Manchester United F.C. players
Year of death missing
Association football forwards